Birsa Munda Stadium may refer to several sports stadiums in India:

 Birsa Munda Athletics Stadium, Ranchi
 Birsa Munda Football Stadium, Ranchi
 Birsa Munda Hockey Stadium, Ranchi
 Birsa Munda International Hockey Stadium, Rourkela